Tavish Hamilton Scott (born 6 May 1966) is a former Scottish politician.  He was the Member of the Scottish Parliament (MSP) for Shetland from 1999 to 2019, and Leader of the Scottish Liberal Democrats from 2008 to 2011. He stepped down as Leader after the 2011 Scottish Parliament election, in which the Liberal Democrats were reduced to five seats, down from 16 in the previous parliament.

Background, education and early career
Scott was born on 6 May 1966 in Inverness, Scotland, he attended Anderson High School, Lerwick, Shetland and holds a BA (Hons) Business Studies from Napier College in Edinburgh. After graduating, he worked as a parliamentary assistant to Jim Wallace, then Lib Dem MP for Orkney and Shetland, and later as a Press Officer for the Scottish Liberal Democrats. He then returned to Shetland and became a farmer and also a councillor on Shetland Islands Council and Chairman of the Lerwick Harbour Trust.

Member of the Scottish Parliament
Scott was elected the first Member of the Scottish Parliament for Shetland in May 1999. He was also the first parliamentarian for the Shetland Islands as a distinct entity; up to that point there had only been a single UK parliamentary constituency for both Orkney and Shetland. He served as a Deputy Minister for Parliament in the Scottish Executive from 2000 to 2001 in succession to his colleague Iain Smith, but resigned after refusing to support the Executive in a vote in the Parliament on a tie-up scheme for fishing.

In 2003, he returned to the Scottish Executive as Deputy Minister for Finance and Public Services.  During his time there his department piloted the Local Governance (Scotland) Act, which changed the elections for local authorities in Scotland to a proportional representation system.  Following Nicol Stephen's election as party leader and succession as Deputy First Minister of Scotland in 2005, Scott was appointed to the Cabinet as Minister for Transport. He was re-elected with an increased majority in May 2007, and held the largest margin by percentage, 50.1%, of any MSP over their closest challenger.

After the resignation of his friend and former ministerial colleague Nicol Stephen, Scott declared his candidacy for the leadership of the Scottish Liberal Democrats on 7 July 2008 at Lerwick harbour, surrounded by a group of men dressed as Vikings which is a tradition in Shetland called Up Helly Aa where Shetlanders celebrate their Viking heritage.  On 26 August 2008, he was announced the winner of the leadership contest with 59% (1,450) of the votes.

Following what he described as a "disastrous" set of results for the Scottish Liberal Democrats in the Scottish elections in May 2011, Scott offered his resignation as leader (remaining a Member of the Scottish Parliament). He claimed the poor showings were in part due to the coalition deal which saw the Liberal Democrats form a government with the Conservatives after the 2010 United Kingdom general election.

In the run-up to the 2014 Scottish Independence referendum, Scott was a keen advocate of a "No" vote as well as recognition that whatever the outcome of the referendum there ought to be a recognition of "Northern Isles’ right to determine their own future." At the Liberal Democrat party conference in 2013 put forward a motion with fellow MSP Liam McArthur to recognise the Islands had a  "separate right to self-determination" Scott said that his preferred outcome was for Shetland to become a crown dependency of the UK with its own parliament, and was backed by the cross-party Wir Shetland movement that campaigns for crown dependency status.

Scott announced in June 2019 that he would be resigning from the Scottish Parliament to take a position with the Scottish Rugby Union.

Career timeline
1986–1989: Napier College
1989–1990: Parliamentary researcher to Jim Wallace MP for Orkney and Shetland, House of Commons
1990–1992: Press Officer, Scottish Liberal Democrats, Edinburgh
1992–1999: Farmer, Shetland family farm
1994–1999: Chairman and Trustee, Lerwick Harbour Trust
1994–1999: Councillor for Lerwick Harbour and Bressay ward on Shetland Islands Council
Vice-chairman of the Roads and Transport Committee
1997–1999: Director, Shetland Islands Tourism
1999–2019: Member of the Scottish Parliament for Shetland
2000–2001: Deputy Minister for Scottish Parliament
2003–2005: Deputy Minister for Finance, Public Services and Parliamentary Business
2005–2007: Minister for Transport
2007–2008: Shadow Cabinet Secretary for Finance and Sustainable Growth
Convenor of the Scottish Parliament's Economy, Energy and Tourism Committee
2008–2011: Leader of the Scottish Liberal Democrats
2011–2019: Scottish Liberal Democrat spokesman for business and the economy

References

External links
 
Tavish Scott MSP profile at the site of Scottish Liberal Democrats

1966 births
Living people
People from Inverness
People educated at Anderson High School, Lerwick
People from Shetland
Alumni of Edinburgh Napier University
Liberal Democrat MSPs
Members of the Scottish Parliament 1999–2003
Members of the Scottish Parliament 2003–2007
Members of the Scottish Parliament 2007–2011
Members of the Scottish Parliament 2011–2016
Leaders of the Scottish Liberal Democrats
Members of the Scottish Parliament 2016–2021